The 2012 season was the 33rd season of competitive football in Malaysia.

The season began in January 2012 for the FAM League, Premier League and Super League.

Promotion and relegation (pre-season)

Teams relegated from Super League
 Sarawak FA
 Kedah FA
 Sabah FA
 Kuala Lumpur FA

Teams promoted to Super League
 Angkatan Tentera Malaysia
 Pahang FA

Teams relegated from Premier League
 Betaria FC
 Perlis FA
 MBJB FC

Teams promoted to Premier League
 Suruhanjaya Perkhidmatan Awam FC

Honours

Trophy and league champions

National teams competitions

Men's senior team

1 Non FIFA 'A' international match

League XI

Men's under-23 team

League tables

Super League

Premier League

FAM League

President Cup

The final was played at Perak Stadium, Perak on Tuesday, 26 July 2011.

Domestic Cups

Charity Shield

The 2011 edition was played at National Stadium, Bukit Jalil, Kuala Lumpur on Saturday, 7 January 2012.

FA Cup

The final was played at National Stadium, Bukit Jalil, Kuala Lumpur, on Saturday, 19 May 2011.

Malaysia Cup

The final was played on 20 October 2012 at the Shah Alam Stadium, Shah Alam in Selangor, Malaysia.

Coaching changes

Super League

Premier League

Transfers

References